Carl Magnus Oscar Friström (16 January 1856 – 26 June 1918), generally known as Oscar Fristrom, was a portrait painter and art teacher born in Sweden, who had a substantial career in Queensland and South Australia, and was best known for his depictions of Aboriginal Australians. Fristrom did a number of Aboriginal portraits and paintings.

History
Fristrom was born a son of C. Friström of Sturkö, Blekinge in Sweden. He arrived in Brisbane, Australia in 1883. By 1885 Oscar was employed at the Elite Photo Co., owned by D. H. Hutchison, where he was responsible for the colouring and over-painting of photographic portraits, which was much in vogue at the time.

In 1884 Fristrom exhibited in the fine arts section of the annual Queensland National Association Exhibition, and by the late 1880s he was one of the few professional artists in Brisbane. He was also one of the first artists to create portraits of Aboriginal people, created through the technique of over-painting photographs.

He was largely self-taught, but his second oil painting was of sufficient merit to be shown at the 1886 Brisbane Exhibition.

He was, with L. W. K. Wirth, James Laurence Watts, and Walter Jenner, in 1888 a founding member of the Queensland Art Society. This led to R. Godfrey Rivers working for the foundation of the Queensland National Art Gallery.

He left for Adelaide in September 1893, where he found employment with Fritz & Co. photographic studio, and in November was accepted as a member of the Adelaide Easel Club. While in Adelaide, Fristrom painted and sketched portraits of well-known Adelaide identity, Aboriginal man Poltpalingada Booboorowie. In August 1894 an exhibition of oil portraits by Fristrom was mounted at the "Easel Clubroom" at 62, Rundle Street in Adelaide.

He returned to Brisbane in September 1894.

The Society of Artists went into decline around 1901. In 1904 a new Society of Artists was formed; meetings were held in Fristrom's studio in "Oakden Chambers", Queen Street. Fristrom  was its president at the time of his death, as well as a member of the advisory board of the Queensland National Art Gallery.

Family
Oscar married Caroline Rooke (1865 – 17 July 1948) of Breakfast Creek, Queensland; 
in 1911 they settled at Mooloolah, Queensland, later moved to Caloundra, then 52 Wharf Street, Brisbane. She was well known as a musician and music teacher. They had two children:
Carl (25 March 1886 – ) married Ruby May Rooke (his cousin?) on 20 August 1921.
Alma Christina (6 July 1889 – 2 December 1943) married Samuel Burgess; they lived at Caloundra.

Oscar had a brother Edward Friström, also an artist in Brisbane, and from 1903 in New Zealand. He married Margaret Johnston of South Brisbane in July 1886; they had a daughter Olivia, a promising pianist, and a son. Another brother, Tage Edward Friström, a member of the US Voluntary Infantry, was killed in 1898 fighting Spain in Manila.

Dying on 26 June 1918, his funeral moved from the funeral parlour of John Hislop & Sons to the South Brisbane Cemetery.

Notable works 

In 1905 Fristrom sculpted a bust of Augustus Charles Gregory, an explorer and first Surveyor-General of Queensland. In February 1906, Fristrom offered to sell the bust to the Royal Geographical Society of Queensland but the society decided not to buy it; however, they did display it at an event in June 1906. For many years the bust was displayed at Freemasons’ Gregory Lodge in Cairns (Gregory being depicted wearing his Masonic regalia). In 2018, the Freemasons donated the bust to the Museum of Lands, Mapping and Surveying in Brisbane. As at 10 March 2020, the bust is at the entrance of the museum.

References

Further reading 

 
 
Johnston, W. Ross (25 June 2012), Oscar Fristrom and his Aboriginal Painting , John Oxley Library Blog, State Library of Queensland.
Schafer, Tania (7 February 2022), Oscar Fristrom Collection, John Oxley Library Blog, State Library of Queensland.

Australian portrait painters
1856 births
1918 deaths
Artists from Brisbane
Artists from Queensland
Burials in South Brisbane Cemetery
19th-century Australian painters
19th-century Australian male artists
20th-century Australian painters
20th-century Australian male artists
Australian male painters